is a Japanese footballer currently playing for Yokohama F. Marinos.

National team career
In October 2009, he was elected Japan U-17 national team for 2009 U-17 World Cup. He played full time in all 3 matches as a right back.

He made his debut for Japan national football team on 30 March 2021 in a World Cup qualifier against Mongolia.

Club statistics
Updated to 29 November 2022.

Appearances in major competitions

Honours

Club
Yokohama F. Marinos
 J1 League: 2019, 2022

References

External links

Profile at Yokohama F. Marinos 

1993 births
Living people
Association football people from Ōita Prefecture
Japanese footballers
Japan youth international footballers
Japan international footballers
J1 League players
J2 League players
J3 League players
Oita Trinita players
Albirex Niigata players
Yokohama F. Marinos players
J.League U-22 Selection players
Association football defenders